Maclura cochinchinensis, commonly known as cockspur thorn, is a species of vine or scrambling shrub in the family Moraceae. The native range extends from China, through Malesia and into Queensland and northern New South Wales. The species inhabits various types of tropical forest: most commonly in monsoon forests. The globular, yellow or orange fruit are sweet and edible and were a traditional food source for Australian Aborigines.

References

cochinchinensis
Flora of Indo-China
Flora of Malesia
Flora of Christmas Island
Flora of Queensland
Flora of New South Wales
Bushfood
Taxa named by João de Loureiro